The 708th Airlift Squadron is an inactive United States Air Force Reserve unit.  It was last assigned to the 349th Operations Group at Travis Air Force Base, California, where it was inactivated on 30 September 1996.

The squadron was active during World War II as the 308th Troop Carrier Squadron a training unit that was part of the I Troop Carrier Command.

It was activated in 1972 as an associate unit, flying aircraft assigned to the regular Air Force 60th Military Airlift Wing.

History
The 308th Troop Carrier Squadron was activated as an operational training unit (OTU) in March 1943 and served in this role until July 1943. The OTU program involved the use of an oversized parent unit to provide cadres to "satellite groups". The 308th then served as a replacement training unit (RTU) for glider crews until April 1944. RTUs were oversized units to train individual pilots or aircrews.

However, the United States Army Air Forces found that standard military units, based on relatively inflexible tables of organization were proving less well adapted to the training mission.  Accordingly, a more functional system was adopted in which each base was organized into a separate numbered unit. Accordingly, the 307th was disbanded and its mission, personnel, and equipment were absorbed by the 805th AAF Base Unit (Replacement Training Unit, Troop Carrier).

The 708th Military Airlift Squadron was activated at Travis AFB, California in 1972 as an Air Force Reserve associate squadron. The squadron did not have aircraft assigned, but flew Lockheed C-141 Starlifter aircraft assigned to the regular United States Air Force 60th Military Airlift Wing (later 60th Airlift Wing).  The squadron was inactivated in 1996 as part of phaseout of C-141s.

Lineage
308th Troop Carrier Squadron
 Constituted 308th Troop Carrier Squadron on 15 March 1943
 Activated on 15 March 1943
 Disbanded on 14 April 1944
 Reconstituted on 19 September 1985 and consolidated with the 708th Military Airlift Squadron as the 708th Military Airlift Squadron

708th Airlift Squadron
 Constituted as 708th Military Airlift Squadron (Associate) on 18 October 1971 and allotted to the reserve
 Activated on 1 October 1972
 Consolidated on 19 September 1985 with 308th Troop Carrier Squadron
 Redesignated 708th Airlift Squadron (Associate) on 1 February 1992
 Redesignated 708th Airlift Squadron on 1 October 1994
 Inactivated on 30 September 1996

Assignments
 10th Troop Carrier Group, 15 March 1943 – 14 April 1944
 938th Military Airlift Group (Associate), 1 October 1972
 349th Military Airlift Wing (Associate), 1 July 1973
 349th Operations Group, 1 August 1992 – 30 September 1996

Stations
 Baer Field, Indiana, 15 March 1943
 Grenada Army Air Field, Mississippi, 6 May 1943
 Lawson Field, Georgia, 5 June 1943
 Grenada Army Air Field, Mississippi, 28 January 1944
 Alliance Army Air Field, Nebraska, 12 March 1944 – 14 April 1944.
 Travis AFB, California, 1 July 1973 – 1 August 1992

Aircraft
 Douglas C-47 Skytrain, 1943–1944
 Douglas C-53 Skytrooper, 1943–1944
 Lockheed C-141 Starlifter, 1972–1996

References

Notes

Bibliography

 
 

Military units and formations established in 1972
Airlift squadrons of the United States Air Force